The Hutt River (Kaurna: Parriworta) is a river located in the Mid North and Clare Valley regions of the Australian state of South Australia.

Course and features
The river descends  over its  course.

The Hutt River catchment has five catchment sub-regions; Hutt River, Stanley Flat, Armagh Creek, White Hutt Creek, and Bungaree. Armagh Creek is the most significant tributary. The twin of the Hutt River, running parallel to it but separated by a low range, is the Hill River.

History
It is one of several Mid North streams visited in early April 1839 by explorer John Hill.  Hill named the river after Sir William Hutt, who was one of the South Australian Colonization Commissioners in London. Sir William's brother John Hutt was originally recommended to become the first Governor of South Australia, but he turned it down in favour of John Hindmarsh.  John Hutt later became Governor of Western Australia from 1839 until 1846.

Hill traced the Hutt downstream to just below the present town of Clare. In late May 1839, based upon information supplied by Hill, the explorer Edward John Eyre followed in Hill's footsteps, tracing it downstream to its junction with the Broughton River.

See also

References

Rivers of South Australia
Mid North (South Australia)